Fourth Crossing (formerly, Foremans) is an unincorporated community in Calaveras County, California. The community is in ZIP code 95248 and area code 209.

Located on San Antonio Creek, the town was originally named Foremans, after its founder David Foreman, but became known as Fourth Crossing, as it was located at the fourth river crossing on the Stockton–Murphys Road. Foreman had established a ferry to cross the river, which they replaced with a toll bridge. The bridge is still standing to the west of the bridge that Hwy. 49 runs on.

The town was famous in the 1850s for its rich placer ores, which were replaced by lode mining. After the gold ran out, the town continued to operate as an important stagecoach and freighting depot, serving the southern mines until after the turn of the 20th century. The county's first Justice Court was established here, complete with a Justice of the Peace.

Today the town is little more than a few buildings and it is registered as California Historical Landmark #258.

A post office was opened in 1855 and discontinued in 1888; re-established in 1892 and closed for good in 1925.

Politics

References

External links

Unincorporated communities in California
Unincorporated communities in Calaveras County, California
California Historical Landmarks